Kissimmee Prairie Preserve State Park is a Florida state park, located approximately 25 miles north of Okeechobee, off US 441.

Gallery

External links

 Kissimmee Prairie Preserve State Park at Florida State Parks
 Kissimmee Prairie Preserve State Park at State Parks
 Kissimmee Prairie Preserve State Park at Wildernet
 Kissimmee Prairie

Grasslands of Florida
State parks of Florida
Parks in Okeechobee County, Florida